Vitaly Hryhorovych Yarema (born 14 October 1963) is a Ukrainian politician, law enforcement expert who was General Prosecutor of Ukraine from 19 June 2014 until 10 February 2015. His previous position was First Deputy Prime Minister of Ukraine in Yatsenyuk Government since 27 February 2014, where he was responsible for law enforcement and the power block. Yarema was an MP of Batkivshchyna party (unaffiliated), a former head of the Ministry of Internal Affairs of Ukraine in Kyiv (2005–2010), and a retired lieutenant-general of police.

Biography 
1971–1981 — studied at Velykokaratulska secondary school in Pereiaslav-Khmelnytskyi Raion, Kyiv Oblast.

1981–1983 — served military service.

1983–1985 — served in bodies of the Internal Affairs on the post of a policeman of a police battalion of the Department of private security at the Dniprovsky District Department of Internal Affairs, Kyiv.

1985–1987 — studied at the Kaliningrad special high school of militia of the Ministry of Internal Affairs of the USSR.

1987–1990 — district inspector of police at Dniprovsky District Department of Internal Affairs, Kyiv.

1989–1993 — studied at the Academy of Internal Affairs of Ukraine on specialty "Science of law".

1990–1993 — served in bodies of internal Affairs as a detective and Deputy Chief of criminal investigation Department at the Dniprovsky District Department of Internal Affairs, Kyiv.

1993–1994 — Deputy Department Head — Head of Department of Department on struggle against organized criminal group and the manifestations of the criminal investigation Department police, Kyiv.

1994–1997 — Deputy Head of the Criminal Investigation Department — Head of the Department of struggle against group and organized criminal cases.

1997–1999 — Head of the Criminal Investigation Department.

1999–2001 — Deputy Chief of the Criminal Investigation Department of the Internal Affairs Ministry of Ukraine.

2001–2003 — Head of Internal Affairs of Ukraine in Lviv Railways.

February — August 2003 — First Deputy Head of the Main Department — Head of the Department of struggle against organized crime of MIA, Kyiv

August — November 2003 — Deputy Head of the Criminal Investigation Department — Head of the Department of struggle against organized crime in Ukraine.

2003–2005 — First Deputy Chief of the Criminal Investigation Department of Interior Ministry of Ukraine.

2005–2010 — Head of the Main Department of Internal Affairs of Ukraine in Kyiv.

Politics 
In 2006 he was elected a deputy of the Kyiv City Council.

2012–2014 — People's Deputy of Ukraine, 7th convocation, deputy chairman of the Verkhovna Rada of Ukraine on combating organized crime and corruption. In 2013 — Chairman of the parliamentary ad hoc committee of the Verkhovna Rada of Ukraine on the investigation of the attack on the media on 18 May 2013 in Kyiv and investigation of other cases of pressure on the media, obstruction of journalistic activities.

From 27 February 2014 — First Vice Prime Minister of Ukraine.

Yarema did not participate in the 2014 Ukrainian parliamentary election.

General Prosecutor of Ukraine
On 19 June 2014 A total of 329 MPs voted Yarema in as General Prosecutor of Ukraine following the respective nomination submitted by Ukrainian President Petro Poroshenko.

Family 
Yarema and his wife Margarita have three children. A 25-year-old son Valery, 22-year-old daughter Ilona and 6-year-old daughter Roxolana.

Awards 

In 1999 by the Decree of the President of Ukraine, he was awarded the medal "For Irreproachable Service" III.

Honored Lawyer of Ukraine.

References

External links 
 Cabinet of Ukraine

1963 births
Living people
People from Kyiv Oblast
Ukrainian jurists
Seventh convocation members of the Verkhovna Rada
First vice prime ministers of Ukraine
General Prosecutors of Ukraine
People of the Euromaidan
Pro-Ukrainian people of the 2014 pro-Russian unrest in Ukraine
Pro-Ukrainian people of the war in Donbas